Alejandra Echevarria (born 1989 in Jaén) is a Spanish beauty queen, fashion model, and singer. She represented Spain in the beauties for a cause pageant, Miss Earth 2009 and placed as Miss Fire (3rd Runner up equivalent). She won second runner up in the annual national Miss Spain 2009 at a gala held in Cancun, Mexico.

Background
Echevarria is a professional singer and currently studying Business Administration and Management. She has been working part-time as a ramp and fashion model. She has a body measurements of 90-61-91.

Miss España
Echevarria won the Miss Jaén 2008. She was also awarded Miss Congeniality during the competition aside from winning the title. She represented her State in the Miss España 2009 (Miss Spain 2009), where she won second runner up in Cancun, Mexico. Fifty-two contestants competed in the Miss Spain 2009 pageant, which was held for the first time outside Spain. She was an early favorite, both by the public and by the jury during the Miss Spain competition.

Miss Earth 2009
Echevarria, who stands 5 feet and 11 inches tall, represented Spain in the ninth edition of Miss Earth beauty pageant and placed as Miss Fire (3rd Runner up equivalent). The pageant was held at the Boracay Ecovillage Resort and Convention Center, in the Island of Boracay, Philippines, on 22 November 2009. The Miss Earth winner serves as the spokesperson for the Miss Earth Foundation, the United Nations Environment Programme (UNEP) and other environmental organizations. Around 80 contestants from different countries and territories competed in the event.

See also
Miss Earth
Miss Earth 2009

References

External links
Miss Earth official website
Woman of the Earth
Miss España official website

1989 births
Living people
Miss Earth 2009 contestants
Spanish beauty pageant winners